

Cabinet 

Government of South Africa
Executive branch of the government of South Africa
Cabinets of South Africa
1974 establishments in South Africa
1978 disestablishments in South Africa
Cabinets established in 1974
Cabinets disestablished in 1978